The list of Super NES enhancement chips demonstrates Nintendo hardware designers' plan to easily expand the Super Nintendo Entertainment System with special coprocessors. This standardized selection of chips was available to licensed developers, to increase system performance and features for each game cartridge. As increasingly superior chips became available throughout the Super NES's generation, this provided a cheaper and more versatile way of maintaining the system's market lifespan compared to Nintendo's option of having included a much more expensive CPU or a more obsolete stock chipset.

The presence of an enhancement chip is 1732 games total often indicated by 16 additional pins on either side of the original pins, 8 to each side.

Super FX

The Super FX chip is a 16-bit supplemental RISC CPU developed by Argonaut Software. It is typically programmed to act as a graphics accelerator chip that draws polygons and advanced 2D effects to a frame buffer in the RAM sitting adjacent to it. Super Mario World 2: Yoshi's Island uses the Super FX 2 for sprite scaling, rotation, and stretching.

This chip has at least four revisions, first as a surface mounted chip labeled "MARIO CHIP 1" (Mathematical, Argonaut, Rotation & I/O), commonly called the Super FX, in the earliest Star Fox (1993) cartridges. From 1994, some boards have an epoxy version, and later a first revision is labeled GSU-1. The GSU-1 however runs at the full 21.47 MHz. The design was revised to the GSU-2, which is still 16-bit, but this version can support a ROM size greater than 8 Mbit. The final known revision is the GSU-2-SP1. All versions of the Super FX chip are functionally compatible in terms of their instruction set. The differences are in packaging, pinout, maximum supported ROM size, and internal clock speed.

Cx4

The Cx4 chip is a math coprocessor used by Capcom and produced by Hitachi (now Renesas) to perform general trigonometric calculations for wireframe effects, sprite positioning, and rotation. It maps and transforms wireframes in Capcom's second and third games of the Mega Man X series. It is based on the Hitachi HG51B169 DSP and clocked at 20Mhz. The name Cx4 stands for Capcom Consumer Custom Chip.

A Cx4 self-test screen can be accessed by holding the 'B' button on the second controller upon system start-up in both Mega Man X2 and Mega Man X3.

DSP

This series of fixed-point digital signal processor chips provides fast vector-based calculations, bitmap conversions, 2D and 3D coordinate transformations, and other functions. The chip has four revisions, each physically identical but with different microcode. The DSP-1 version, including the later 1A die shrink and 1B bug fix revisions, was most often used; the DSP-2, DSP-3, and DSP-4 were used in only one game each. All of them are based on the NEC µPD77C25 CPU and clocked at 8 MHz.

DSP-1
The DSP-1 is the most varied and widely used of the Super NES DSPs, in more than 15 separate games. It is used as a math coprocessor in games such as Super Mario Kart and Pilotwings that require more advanced Mode 7 scaling and rotation. It provides fast support for the floating-point and trigonometric calculations needed by 3D math algorithms. The later DSP-1A and DSP-1B serve the same purpose as the DSP-1. The DSP-1A is a die shrink of the DSP-1, and the DSP-1B corrects several bugs. The DSP-1B introduced a bug in the Pilotwings demo due to the game code not being updated for the timing differences of the chip revisions.

DSP-2
The DSP-2 is only in Dungeon Master. Its primary purpose is to convert Atari ST bitmap image data into the Super NES bitplane format. It also provides dynamic scaling capability and transparency effects.

DSP-3
DSP-3 is only in the turn-based strategy game SD Gundam GX for Super Famicom. It assists with tasks like calculating the next AI move, Shannon–Fano bitstream decompression, and bitplane conversion of graphics.

DSP-4
DSP-4 is used in only Top Gear 3000. It primarily assists with drawing the race track, especially during the times that the track branches into multiple paths.

Sharp LR35902

The hardware inside the Super Game Boy peripheral includes a Sharp SM83 core identical to the CPU in the handheld Game Boy. Because the Super NES is not powerful enough for software emulation of the Game Boy, the hardware for the entire handheld is inside of the cartridge.

MX15001TFC

This chip was made by MegaChips exclusively for Nintendo Power cartridges for the Super Famicom. The cartridges have flash ROMs instead of mask ROMs, to hold games downloaded for a fee at retail kiosks in Japan. The chip manages communication with the kiosks to download ROM images, and provides game selection menu. Some games were produced both in cartridge and download form, and others were download only. The service was closed in February 2007.

OBC-1
OBC-1 is a sprite manipulation chip used exclusively in the Super Scope game Metal Combat: Falcon's Revenge, the sequel to Battle Clash.

Rockwell RC2324DPL

The Rockwell RC96V24DP is a low power, V.22 bis 2400 bit/s data/fax modem data pump in a single VLSI package, used in the XBAND cartridge.

S-DD1

The S-DD1 chip is an ASIC decompressor made by Nintendo for use in some Super Nintendo Entertainment System Game Paks. Designed to handle data compressed by the ABS Lossless Entropy Algorithm, a form of arithmetic coding developed by Ricoh, its use is necessary in games where massive amounts of sprite data are compressed with a total design limit of 32-megabits. This data is decompressed dynamically by the S-DD1 and given directly to the picture processing unit.

The S-DD1 mediates between the Super NES's Ricoh 5A22 CPU and the game's ROM via two buses. However, the controlling 5A22 processor may still request normal, uncompressed data from the game's ROM even if the S-DD1 is already busy with a decompression operation. This form of parallelism allows sprite data to be decompressed while other types of data are quickly passed to the main CPU.

Star Ocean and Street Fighter Alpha 2 are the only games that use this chip. Emulation of the S-DD1 was initially difficult, requiring "graphics packs" to be provided for the affected games, until the compression algorithm was identified.

S-RTC
S-RTC is a real-time clock chip used in one game, Daikaijuu Monogatari II.

SA1

The Super Accelerator 1 (SA1) chip is used in 34 Super NES games, including Super Mario RPG: Legend of the Seven Stars.

Similar to the 5A22 CPU in the Super NES hardware, the SA1 contains a processor core based on the 65C816 with several programmable timers. The SA1 does not function as a slave CPU for the 5A22; both can interrupt each other independently.

The SA1 also features a range of enhancements over the standard 65C816:
 10.74 MHz clock speed, compared to the 5A22's maximum of 3.58 MHz
 Faster RAM, including 2 KB of internal RAM
 Memory mapping capabilities
 Limited data storage and compression
 New DMA modes such as bitmap to bit plane transfer
 Arithmetic functions (multiplication, division, and cumulative)
 Hardware timer (either as a linear 18-bit timer, or synchronised with the PPU to generate an IRQ at a specific H/V scanline location)
 Built-in CIC lockout, for copy protection and regional marketing control

Brazilian ROM hacker Vitor Vilela has created ROM patches for Contra III: The Alien Wars, Gradius III, Super Mario World, Super R-Type, and Race Drivin' that shifts some work from the Super NES's CPU onto the SA-1 co-processor.  This improves the frame rate consistency, load times, and sprite limit.

SPC7110
A data decompression chip designed by Epson, used in three games by Hudson. Tengai Makyou Zero also contains a real-time clock chip accessed via the SPC7110.

ST

The ST series of chips are used by SETA Corporation to enhance AI.

ST010
Used for general functions and handling the AI of opponent cars in F1 ROC II: Race of Champions. It contains a NEC µPD96050 DSP, clocked at 10Mhz.

ST011
ST011 is used for AI functionality in the shogi board game Hayazashi Nidan Morita Shogi. It also uses a NEC µPD96050, clocked at 15 Mhz.

ST018
The ST018 is used for AI functionality in Hayazashi Nidan Morita Shogi 2. It is a 21.47 MHz, 32-bit ARMv3 processor.

List of Super NES games with enhancement chips

Canceled games

See also
 Memory management controller is the Nintendo Entertainment System's (NES) previous generation of enhancement chips.

References

Graphics processing units
Nintendo chips
Super Nintendo Entertainment System accessories